Union Sportive Madinet Sétif, known as USM Sétif or simply USMS for short, is an Algerian football club located in Sétif, Algeria. The club was founded in 1933 and its colors are garnet and white. Their home stadium, Stade 8 Mai 1945, has a capacity of 18,000 spectators. The club is currently playing in the Inter-Régions Division.

History
The club was founded in 1933 under the name of Union Sportive Musulmane de Sétif, officially declared under the name of Union Sportive Franco-Musulmane de Sétif it's the oldest of Sétif. The club was champion of the Constantine League twice in 1946 and 1951. After independence in 1962, the club played in first division during two seasons 1973-74 and 1974-75.
The club was also named Ittihad Riadhi Baladiat Sétif between the 70s and the 80s.

In 2005, USM Sétif reached the final of the Algerian Cup for the first time in the club's history. However, in the final, they lost 1–0 against ASO Chlef.

Achievement
Constantine League
Champions (2): 1946, 1951
Algerian Cup
Runners-up (1): 2005

Notable players
 Rachid Mekhloufi
 Abdelhamid Kermali
 lamiri ilyes

References

External links
Facebook

Football clubs in Algeria
Association football clubs established in 1933
Usm Setif
1933 establishments in Algeria
Sports clubs in Algeria